The History of Catholic Education in the United States extends from the early colonial era in Louisiana and Maryland to the parochial school system set up in most parishes in the 19th century, to hundreds of colleges, all down to the present.

Colonial era

There was a small Catholic population in the English colonies, chiefly in Maryland. It supported local schools, often under Jesuit auspices. The Oblate Sisters of Providence, the first Black order of nuns, pioneered in educating Black children in the area, founding St. Frances Academy in 1828 (the first and oldest Black Catholic school in the US). 

Much more important were schools of New Orleans, under Spanish and French control until 1803. Well-to-do families sent their children to private Catholic schools run by Ursulines and other orders of nuns. The earliest continually operating school for girls in the United States is Ursuline Academy in New Orleans. It was founded in 1727 and graduated the first female pharmacist and the first woman to contribute a book of literary merit. It was the first free school and first retreat center for ladies, and first classes for female African-American slaves, free women of color, and Native Americans. In the Gulf Coast and Mississippi Valley, Ursulines provided the first center of social welfare in the Mississippi Valley, first boarding school in Louisiana and the first school of music in New Orleans.

Some orders, like the Sisters of the Holy Family (the second order open to Black women), also educated enslaved children and other Black students who otherwise were not allowed to be taught. Specifically, they brought literacy and training in job skills to both free and enslaved black girls, especially through St. Mary's Academy (founded during the Civil War and still operating). 

The small Spanish Catholic communities in New Mexico and California, which joined the United States in 1848, had little in the way of organized schooling.

Catholic universities were also founded during this era, and grew exponentially alongside parochial schools in the late 19th and early- to mid-20th centuries. The universities remained strong even after the parochial schools went into decline during the national religious upheaval of the 70s and 80s, and many continue to this day.

Parochial era

As the nation was mostly Protestant in the 19th century, there was anti-Catholic sentiment related to heavy immigration from Catholic Ireland after the 1840s, and a feeling that Catholic children should be educated in public schools to become American. 

The main impetus was fear that exposure to Protestant teachers in the public schools, and Protestant fellow students, would lead to a loss of faith. Protestants reacted by strong opposition to any public funding of parochial schools.   The Catholics nevertheless built their elementary schools, parish by parish, using very low paid sisters as teachers.

Blaine Amendments 

In 1875, Republican President Ulysses S. Grant called for a Constitutional amendment that would mandate free public schools and prohibit the use of public funds for "sectarian" schools. He said he feared a future with "patriotism and intelligence on one side and superstition, ambition and greed on the other" which he identified with the Catholic Church. Grant called for public schools that would be "unmixed with atheistic, pagan or sectarian teaching."

A leading republican, Senator James G. Blaine of Maine had proposed such an amendment to the Constitution in 1874.  The amendment was turned down by Congress in 1875 and never became federal law. However, it would be used as a model for so-called "Blaine Amendments" incorporated into 34 state constitutions over the next three decades. These amendments prohibited the use of public funds to fund parochial schools and are still in effect today.

Colleges and universities 
Fed increasingly throughout the late 19th and early 20th centuries by the growing number of Catholic school students at the primary and secondary level, Catholic universities have existed since the early era of the United States and centered at the time in the DMV metro area (including Georgetown, Catholic U, and Trinity Washington; Notre Dame is one notable exception outside of that area).

Women's colleges
The first Catholic women's college in the US was Saint Mary-of-the-Woods College in Indiana, which was granted a charter for the higher education of women in 1846. Notre Dame of Maryland opened a four-year college in 1895. Another 42 Catholic women's colleges opened by 1925.

The ACCU 

The Association of Catholic Colleges and Universities was founded in 1899.

Parochial school growth and structure 
In 1904, Catholic educators formed an organization to coordinate their efforts on a national scale: the Catholic Educational Association which later changed its name to the National Catholic Educational Association.

In the classrooms, the highest priorities were piety, orthodoxy, and strict discipline. Knowledge of the subject matter was a minor concern, and in the late 19th century few of the teachers in parochial schools had gone beyond the 8th grade themselves. The sisters came from numerous denominations, and there was no effort to provide joint teachers training programs. The bishops were indifferent. Finally around 1911, led by the Catholic University in Washington, Catholic colleges began summer institutes to train the sisters in pedagogical techniques. Long past World War II, the Catholic schools were noted for inferior conditions compared to the public schools, and fewer well-trained teachers.

The number of schools and students grew apace with the taxpayer-funded public schools. In 1900, the Church supported 3,500 parochial schools, usually under the control of the local parish. 

By 1920, the number of elementary schools had reached 6,551, enrolling 1.8 million pupils taught by 42,000 teachers, the great majority of whom were nuns. Secondary education likewise boomed. In 1900, there were only about 100 Catholic high schools, but by 1920 more than 1,500 were in operation.

Supreme Court upholds parochial schools 

In 1922, the voters of Oregon passed an initiative amending Oregon Law Section 5259, the Compulsory Education Act. The law unofficially became known as the Oregon School Law. The citizens' initiative was primarily aimed at eliminating parochial schools, including Catholic schools. The law caused outraged Catholics to organize locally and nationally for the right to send their children to Catholic schools and thereby prevent them from socializing with and possibly marrying Protestants or otherwise assimilating into American culture, . In Pierce v. Society of Sisters (1925), the United States Supreme Court declared the Oregon's Compulsory Education Act unconstitutional in a ruling that has been called "the Magna Carta of the parochial school system."  Pierce is also an example of "Substantive due process," a legal principle condemned by Justice Clarence Thomas in Dobbs v. Jackson Women's Health Organization.  Pierce affirms the supposed "liberty" interest of parents to send their children to Catholic schools in disregard of state law when the Constitution makes no mention of, and does not in any manner prohibit a state from regulating, the subject of education.

Irish in the Northeast. 
By 1890 the Irish, who controlled the Church in the U.S., had built an extensive network of parishes and parish schools ("parochial schools") across the urban Northeast and Midwest. The Irish and other Catholic ethnic groups looked to parochial schools not only to protect their religion, but to enhance their culture and language.

Polish in Chicago 

Polish Americans arrived in large numbers, 1890–1914, concentrating in industrial and mining districts in the Northeast and Great Lakes areas. They often sent their children to parochial schools and encouraged their young women to become nuns and teachers.  In 1932 close to 300,000 Polish Americans were enrolled in over 600 Polish grade schools in the United States. Very few of the Polish Americans who graduated from grade school at the time pursued high school or college.

In Chicago, 35,862 students (60 percent of the Polish population) attended Polish parochial schools in 1920. Nearly every Polish parish in the American Catholic Church had a school, whereas in Italian parishes, it was typically one in ten parishes.

Peak and decline of parochial schools 
For more than two generations, enrollment climbed steadily. By the mid-1960s, enrollment in Catholic parochial schools had reached an all-time high of 4.5 million elementary school pupils, with about 1 million students in Catholic high schools. The enrollments steadily declined as Catholics moved to the suburbs, where the children attended public schools.

A major transition took place in the 1970s as most of the teaching nuns left their orders. Many schools closed, others replaced the nuns with much better paid lay teachers and started charging higher tuition.

Growth and decline of women's colleges 
By 1955, there were 116 Catholic colleges for women. Most—but not all—went co-ed, merged, or closed after 1970.

Modern era

Primary and secondary education 
Catholic parochial schools continue to operate, though with less students than in previous eras and with predominantly lay faculty. 

Many independent Catholic schools also exist, and they—like many religious orders' educational institutions—often operate apart from diocesan oversight.

Universities 
Many Catholic universities now operate with an explicit "Catholic in name only" or Cafeterialist disposition and mission. Certain groups like the Cardinal Newman Society have attempted to combat this phenomenon by promoting only the most conservative universities as truly Catholic.

Vigorous debate in recent decades has focused on how to balance Catholic and academic roles in Catholic universities, with conservatives arguing that bishops should exert more control to guarantee orthodoxy.

Notable universities

University of Notre Dame 

The University of Notre Dame, founded in northern Indiana in 1842, was modernized in 1919-22 under Rev. James Burns. He brought the school up to national standards by adopting the elective system and starting the abandonment of the traditional scholastic and classical emphasis.  By contrast, the Jesuit colleges, bastions of academic conservatism, were reluctant to move to a system of electives. Their graduates were shut out of Harvard Law School for that reason.

The university was still a small operation best known for football when Rev Theodore Hesburgh took over and served as president for 35 years (1952–87). In that time the annual operating budget rose by a factor of 18 from $9.7 million to $176.6 million, and the endowment by a factor of 40 from $9 million to $350 million, and research funding by a factor of 20 from $735,000 to $15 million. Enrollment nearly doubled from 4,979 to 9,600, faculty more than doubled 389 to 950, and degrees awarded annually doubled from 1,212 to 2,500.

St. Mary's University, Texas

The Society of Mary (the Marianists)  had operated a boys' school in San Antonio Texas since 1852. In 1927, as St. Mary's College it began conferring bachelor's degrees. The school became coeducational in 1963. St. Mary's University is now a nationally recognized liberal arts institution with a diverse student population of nearly 4,000 of all faiths and backgrounds. St. Mary's University School of Law, opened in 1927 in the Bexar County Courthouse as the San Antonio School of Law, became a school of St. Mary's University in 1934.  It is the oldest Catholic law school in the Southwest.

The Catholic University of America

The proposal to create a national Catholic university in America reflected the rising size and influence of the nation's Catholic population and also an ambitious vision of the Church's role in American life during the 19th century.

In 1882 Bishop John Lancaster Spalding went to Rome to obtain Pope Leo XIII's support for the University and persuaded family friend Mary Gwendoline Caldwell to pledge $300,000 to establish it. On March 7, 1889, the Pope issued the encyclical "Magni Nobis", granting the university its charter and establishing its mission as the instruction of Catholicism and human nature together at the graduate level. By developing new leaders and new knowledge, the University would strengthen and enrich Catholicism in the United States. Many of the founders of the CUA held a vision that included both a sense of the Church's special role in United States and also a conviction that scientific and humanistic research, informed by the Faith, would only strengthen the Church. They sought to develop an institution like a national university that would promote the Faith in a context of religious freedom, spiritual pluralism, and intellectual rigor.

When the University first opened for classes in the fall of 1888, the curriculum consisted of lectures in mental and moral philosophy, English literature, the Sacred Scriptures, and the various branches of theology. At the end of the second term, lectures on canon law were added and the first students were graduated in 1889. In 1904, an undergraduate program was added and it quickly established a reputation for excellence.

Notes

Further reading
 Cassidy, Francis P. "Catholic Education in the Third Plenary Council of Baltimore. I." Catholic Historical Review (1948): 257–305. in JSTOR
 Catholic Encyclopedia, (1913) online edition complete coverage by Catholic scholars; the articles were written about 1910
 Coburn, Carol K. and Martha Smith. Spirited Lives: How Nuns Shaped Catholic Culture and American Life, 1836-1920 (1999) pp 129–58  excerpt and text search
 Dolan, Jay P. The American Catholic Experience (1985) ch 10, 14
 Donovan, Grace. "Immigrant Nuns: Their Participation in the Process of Americanization," in Catholic Historical Review 77, 1991, 194–208.
 Fichter, Joseph H. Parochial School: a Sociological Study (1958)
 Gleason, Philip. Contending With Modernity: Catholic Higher Education in the Twentieth Century (1995)  excerpt and text search
 Gleason, Philip, et al. "Baltimore III and education." US Catholic Historian (1985): 273–313. in JSTOR
 Greeley, Andrew M. and Peter H. Rossi. The Education of Catholic Americans (1966)
 Greeley, Andrew M. et al. Catholic Schools and a Declining Church (1976)
 Greeley, Andrew. "The Demography of American Catholics, 1965–1990" in The Sociology of Andrew Greeley (1994).
 Heft, James L. "Catholic High Schools: Facing the New Realities" (2011)
 Hennessy, James  American Catholics: A history of the Roman Catholic community in the United States (1981)
 Hunt, Thomas C., Ellis A. Joseph, and Ronald James Nuzzi, eds. Catholic schools in the United States: An encyclopedia (2 vol. Greenwood Press, 2004) 805pp; covers K12 schools, not colleges
 
 McGuinness Margaret M. Called to Serve: A History of Nuns in America (New York University Press, 2013), ch 3
 Marty, Martin E. Modern American Religion, Vol. 1: The Irony of It All, 1893–1919 (1986); Modern American Religion. Vol. 2: The Noise of Conflict, 1919–1941 (1991); Modern American Religion, Volume 3: Under God, Indivisible, 1941–1960 (1999), Protestant perspective by leading historian
 Morris, Charles R. American Catholic: The Saints and Sinners Who Built America's Most Powerful Church (1998), a popular history
 New Catholic 'Encyclopedia (1967), complete coverage of all topics by Catholic scholars
Sanders, James W. The Education of an urban Minority: Catholics in Chicago, 1833–1965 (Oxford University Press, 1977).
Walch, Timothy. Parish School: American Catholic Parochial Education from Colonial Times to the Present (New York: Crossroad Publishing, 1996)

Historiography
 Gleason, Philip. "The Historiography of American Catholicism as Reflected in The Catholic Historical Review, 1915–2015." Catholic Historical Review 101#2 (2015) pp: 156–222.  online
 Thomas, J. Douglas. "A Century of American Catholic History." US Catholic Historian (1987): 25–49. in JSTOR

Catholic
Education
!
Catholic Church in the United States